The Selfridges Building is a landmark building in Birmingham, England. The building is part of the Bullring Shopping Centre and houses Selfridges Department Store. The building was completed in 2003 at a cost of £60 million and designed by the architecture firm Future Systems. It has a steel framework with sprayed concrete facade. Since its construction, the building has become an iconic architectural landmark and seen as a major contribution to the regeneration of Birmingham. It is included as a desktop background as part of the Architecture theme in Windows 7.

Architecture

The architecture firm Future Systems were appointed by Selfridge's then chief executive, Vittorio Radice, to design only the third store outside London. Although Selfridges was physically integrated with the Bullring Shopping Centre the client wanted a distinct design approach which would set the store apart from the rest of the development and become an instantly recognisable signpost for the brand. The building's facade is curved, wrapping around the corner of Moor Street and Park Street. The facade comprises 15,000 anodised aluminium discs mounted on a blue background.

Awards

RIBA Award for Architecture  2004
Concrete Society Awards, Overall Winner 2004
British Constructional Steelwork Association's Structural Steel Awards 2004
Royal Fine Art Commission Trust, Retail Innovation 2004
Institution of Civil Engineers, Project Award Winner 2004
Civic Trust Award 2004
Retail Week Awards, Retail Destination of the Year 2004

Gallery

References

External links
 

Buildings and structures in Birmingham, West Midlands
Department store buildings in the United Kingdom
Birmingham
Recipients of Civic Trust Awards